Lawrence Wood "Chip" Robert Jr. (1889–1976) was a 1908 graduate of the Georgia Institute of Technology and founder of noted Atlanta engineering and architectural firm, Robert and Company. He served as Assistant Secretary of the Treasury in the early years of the New Deal.

Early life and education

While at Georgia Tech, Robert was the captain of the cross country team in 1906 and the Georgia Tech football and baseball teams in 1908, and earned the maximum of 12 varsity letters. Robert attended Georgia Tech from the fall of 1903 until the summer of 1909, graduating with a degree in civil engineering 1908 and one in experimental engineering in 1909.

Career
He founded Robert and Company, an architectural firm, in 1917. Robert was the president of the Atlanta Crackers, Atlanta's minor league baseball team.

Robert was appointed Assistant Secretary of the Treasury and served from 1933 to 1936; he supervised the Public Works of Art Project, the first arts project of the New Deal. He was then appointed secretary of the Democratic National Committee in 1936, and was the executive officer of the Conference of Southeastern Governors in November 1937.

Robert was appointed to the Georgia Board of Regents in 1937. He was a member during the Cocking affair and voted with the governor to remove Walter Cocking.

Memberships and legacy

Robert was the first-ever recipient of Georgia Tech's Alumni Distinguished Service Award in 1934. He is the namesake for the "Alumni House", the building in which the Georgia Tech Alumni Association has been located since 1979. A scholarship fund was named in his honor in 1971 and designated for the National Merit Scholarship Program in 1979. He was inducted into the Georgia Sports Hall of Fame in 1989.

His daughter, Louisa Robert, was a member of the 1932 United States Olympic team.

See also 

 List of Georgia Tech Yellow Jackets starting quarterbacks

References

External links

 Finding Aid, Lawrence Wood Robert Jr. Papers at Emory University

Georgia Tech Yellow Jackets football players
Georgia Tech alumni
1889 births
1976 deaths
American football quarterbacks
United States Assistant Secretaries of the Treasury